The Douglas SBD Dauntless is a World War II American naval scout plane and dive bomber that was manufactured by Douglas Aircraft from 1940 through 1944. The SBD ("Scout Bomber Douglas") was the United States Navy's main carrier-based scout/dive bomber from mid-1940 through mid-1944. The SBD was also flown by the United States Marine Corps, both from land air bases and aircraft carriers. The SBD is best remembered as the bomber that delivered the fatal blows to the Japanese carriers at the Battle of Midway in June 1942. The type earned its nickname "Slow But Deadly" (from its SBD initials) during this period.

During its combat service, the SBD proved to be an excellent naval scout plane and dive bomber. It possessed long range, good handling characteristics, maneuverability, potent bomb load, great diving characteristics from the perforated dive brakes, good defensive armament, and ruggedness. One land-based variant of the SBD – omitting the arrestor hook — was purpose-built for the U.S. Army Air Forces, as the A-24 Banshee.

Design and development
Design work on the Northrop BT-1 began in 1935. In 1937, the Northrop Corporation was taken over by Douglas, and the active Northrop projects continued under Douglas Aircraft Corporation. The Northrop BT-2 was developed from the BT-1 by modifications ordered in November 1937, and provided the basis of the SBD, which first entered service in mid-1939. Ed Heinemann led a team of designers who considered a development with a  Wright Cyclone engine. The plane was developed at the Douglas El Segundo, California, plant, and that facility, along with the company's Oklahoma City plant, built almost all the SBDs produced. One year earlier, both the U.S. Navy and Marine Corps had placed orders for the new dive bomber, designated the SBD-1 and SBD-2 (the latter had increased fuel capacity and different armament). The SBD-1 went to the Marine Corps in late 1940, and the SBD-2 to the Navy in early 1941, replacing the SBU Corsair and Curtiss SBC Helldiver squadrons on US carriers. Distinctive perforated split flaps or "dive-brakes" had been incorporated into the BT-1 to eliminate tail buffeting during diving maneuvers. Unusual for carrier aircraft, folding wings were not chosen for the design, opting instead for structural strength.

The next version was the SBD-3, which began manufacture in early 1941. It had increased armor, self-sealing fuel tanks, and four machine guns. The SBD-4 provided a 12-volt (up from 6-volt) electrical system, and a few were converted into SBD-4P reconnaissance aircraft.

The next (and most produced) version, the SBD-5, was produced mostly in the Douglas plant in Tulsa, Oklahoma. This version was equipped with a  engine and an increased ammunition supply. Over 2,400 of these were built. A few of them were shipped to the Royal Navy for evaluation. In addition to American service, the SBD saw combat against the Japanese Army and Navy with No. 25 Squadron of the Royal New Zealand Air Force—but the RNZAF soon replaced them with the larger, faster, heavier and land-based Vought F4U Corsairs.

Some SBDs were also flown by the Free French Air Force against the German Heer and Luftwaffe. SBDs were also sold to Mexico.

The final version, the SBD-6, had more improvements, but its production ended during the summer of 1944.

The U.S. Army Air Force had its own version of the SBD, called the A-24 Banshee. It lacked the tail hook used for carrier landings, and a pneumatic tire replaced the solid tail wheel. First assigned to the 27th Bombardment Group (Light) at Hunter Field, Georgia, A-24s flew in the Louisiana maneuvers of September 1941. There were three versions of the Banshee (A-24, A-24A and A-24B) flown by the army to a very minor degree in the early stages of the war. The USAAF used 948 of the 5,937 Dauntlesses built.

Operational history

U.S. Navy and Marine Corps

U.S. Navy and Marine Corps SBDs saw their first action at Pearl Harbor, when most of the Marine Corps SBDs of Marine Scout Bombing Squadron 232 (VMSB-232) were destroyed on the ground at Ewa Mooring Mast Field. Most U.S. Navy SBDs flew from their aircraft carriers, which did not operate in close cooperation with the rest of the fleet. Most Navy SBDs at Pearl Harbor, like their Marine Corps counterparts, were destroyed on the ground. On 10 December 1941, SBDs from  sank the Japanese submarine I-70.

The first major use of the SBD in combat was at the Battle of the Coral Sea where SBDs and TBD Devastators sank the Japanese light aircraft carrier (CVL)  and damaged the Japanese fleet carrier . SBDs were also used for anti-torpedo combat air patrols (CAP) and these scored several victories against Japanese aircraft trying to attack Lexington and Yorktown. Their relatively heavy gun armament with two forward-firing  M2 Browning machine guns and either one or two rear flexible-mount  AN/M2 machine guns was effective against the lightly built Japanese fighters, and many pilots and gunners took aggressive attitudes to the fighters that attacked them. SBD pilot Stanley "Swede" Vejtasa was attacked by three A6M2 Zero fighters; he shot down two of them and cut off the wing of the third in a head-on pass with his wingtip. 

The SBD's most important contribution to the American war effort came during the Battle of Midway in early June 1942. Four squadrons of Navy SBD dive bombers attacked and sank or fatally damaged all four Japanese fleet carriers present, disabling three of them in the span of just six minutes and, later in the day, . They also caught two straggling heavy cruisers of the Midway bombardment group of four, heavily damaging them, with  eventually sinking.

At the Battle of Midway, Marine Corps SBDs were not as effective. One squadron, VMSB-241, flying from Midway Atoll, was not trained in the techniques of dive-bombing with their new Dauntlesses (having just partially converted from the SB2U Vindicator). Its pilots resorted to the slower but easier glide bombing technique. This led to many of the SBDs being shot down during their glide, although one survivor from these attacks is now on display at the National Naval Aviation Museum and is the last surviving aircraft to fly in the battle. The carrier-borne squadrons were effective, especially when they were escorted by Grumman F4F Wildcats. The success of dive bombing was due to one important circumstance:

SBDs played a major role in the Guadalcanal Campaign, operating off both American carriers and from Henderson Field on Guadalcanal. SBDs proved lethal to Japanese shipping that failed to clear New Georgia Sound (the slot) by daylight. Losses inflicted included the carrier , sunk near the Solomon Islands on 24 August. Three other Japanese carriers were damaged during the six-month campaign. SBDs sank a cruiser and nine transports during the Naval Battle of Guadalcanal.

The SBD's strengths and weaknesses became evident. While the American strength was dive bombing, the Japanese stressed their Nakajima B5N2 "Kate" torpedo bombers, which had caused the bulk of the damage during the Japanese attack on Pearl Harbor.

In the Atlantic Ocean the SBD saw action during Operation Torch, the Allied landings in North Africa in November 1942. Eleven months later, during Operation Leader, the SBDs saw their European debut when aircraft from Ranger attacked Nazi German shipping around Bodø, Norway.

By 1944 the U.S. Navy began replacing the SBD with the more powerful SB2C Helldiver. During the Battle of the Philippine Sea in June 1944, a long range twilight strike was made against the retreating Japanese fleet, at (or beyond) the limit of the combat radius of the aircraft. The force had about twenty minutes of daylight over their targets before attempting the long return in the dark. Of the 215 aircraft, only 115 made it back. Twenty were lost to enemy action in the attack and 80 were lost when one by one they expended their fuel and had to ditch into the sea. In the attack were 26 SBDs, all of which made it back to the carriers.

The Battle of the Philippine Sea was the last major engagement of the carrier-borne SBDs. Marine squadrons continued to fly SBDs until the end of the war. Although the Curtiss Helldiver had a more powerful engine, a higher maximum speed and could carry nearly a thousand pounds more in bomb load, many of the dive bomber pilots preferred the SBD, which was lighter and had better low-speed handling characteristics, critical for carrier landings.

The Dauntless was one of the most important aircraft in the Pacific War, sinking more enemy shipping in the Pacific than any other Allied bomber. Barrett Tillman, in his book on the Dauntless, claims that it has a "plus" score against enemy aircraft, meaning it was credited with more victories over enemy planes than losses due to enemy action. This is considered to be a rare event for a nominal "bomber".

A total of 5,936 SBDs were produced during the War. The last SBD rolled off the assembly lines at the Douglas Aircraft plant in El Segundo, California, on 21 July 1944. The Navy placed emphasis on the heavier, faster and longer-ranged SB2C. From Pearl Harbor through April 1944, SBDs had flown 1,189,473 operational hours, with 25 percent of all operational hours flown off aircraft carriers being in SBDs. Its battle record shows that in addition to six Japanese carriers, 14 enemy cruisers had been sunk, along with six destroyers, 15 transports or cargo ships and scores of various lesser craft.

United States Army Air Forces

The U.S. Army Air Forces sent 52 A-24 Banshees in crates to the Philippines in the fall of 1941 to equip the 27th Bombardment Group, whose personnel were sent separately. However, after the Japanese attack on Pearl Harbor, these bombers were diverted to Australia and the 27th BG fought on the Bataan Peninsula as infantry. While in Australia the aircraft were reassembled for flight to the Philippines but their missing parts, including solenoids, trigger motors and gun mounts delayed their shipment. Plagued with mechanical problems, the A-24s were diverted to the 91st Bombardment Squadron and designated for assignment to Java Island instead.

Referring to themselves as "Blue Rock Clay Pigeons" (after a brand of trap shooting targets), the 91st BS which were based at Malang attacked the enemy-held harbor and airbase at Bali and damaged or sank numerous ships around Java during the Dutch East Indies campaign. After the Japanese downed two A-24s and damaged three so badly that they could no longer fly, the 91st received orders to evacuate Java in early March 1942.

The A-24s remaining in Australia were assigned to the 8th Bombardment Squadron of 3d Bombardment Group, to defend New Guinea. On 29 July 1942, seven A-24s attacked a convoy off Buna, but only one survived: the Japanese shot down five of them and damaged the sixth so badly that it did not make it back to base. Regarded by many pilots as too slow, short ranged and poorly armed, the remaining A-24s were relegated to non-combat missions. In the U.S., the A-24s became training aircraft or towed targets for aerial gunnery training. The more powerful A-24B was used later against the Japanese forces in the Gilbert Islands. From December 1943 until March 1944, the 531st Fighter Squadron of the 7th Air Force flew A-24Bs from Makin Island in the Gilbert Islands against Japanese controlled islands in the Marshall Islands. The A-24Bs were then withdrawn from combat.

The A-24B (equivalent to the U.S. Navy SBD-5, with the omission of the arrestor hook) arrived in 1943 with the more powerful 1,200-hp Wright R-1820-60 Cyclone engine, a more powerful engine than either the A-24 or A-24A. As a result, the A-24B could fly slightly faster and higher than the earlier models. The A-24B lacked the small air intake on the top of the engine cowling present on the earlier models and that is an easy way to distinguish the B model. The 407th Bomb Group, assigned to the 11th Air Force, flew A-24Bs against the Japanese held island of Kiska, Alaska, during July and August 1943.

A handful of A-24s survived in the inventory of the USAAF long enough to be taken over by the Air Force (USAF) when that service became independent of the Army in September 1947. The USAF established a new designation system for its aircraft, eliminating the "A-" (for attack) category (through 1962); all of the single-engined "A-" aircraft were given "F-" (for fighter) nomenclature (or were determined to be obsolete and scrapped); thus the few remaining A-24 Banshees became known as F-24 Banshees, soldiering on in a reserve role until 1950 when they were scrapped.

French Air Force and Naval Aviation (Aeronavale)
The first production Dauntless sent into action was the "SBD-3", which was produced for the French Naval Aviation. A total of 174 Dauntlesses were ordered by the French Navy, but with the fall of France in the spring of 1940 that production batch was diverted to the U.S. Navy, which ordered 410 more.

The Free French received about 80 SBD-5s and A-24Bs from the United States in 1944. They were used as trainers and close-support aircraft.
 Free French squadrons received 40 to 50 A-24Bs in Morocco and Algeria during 1943.
 French Naval Aviation (Aeronautique Navale) received 32 in late 1944 for Flotilles 3FB and 4FB (16 SBD-5s for each).

Squadron I/17 Picardie used a few A-24Bs for coastal patrol. The most combat-experienced of the Banshee units was GC 1/18 Vendee, which flew A-24Bs in support of Allied forces in southern France and also experienced how deadly German flak was, losing several aircraft in 1944. This squadron flew from North Africa to recently liberated Toulouse to support Allied and French resistance troops. Later, the unit was assigned to support attacks on cities occupied by the Germans on the French Atlantic coast. In April 1945 each SBD-5 averaged three missions a day in the European theater. In 1946 the French Air Force based its A-24Bs in Morocco as trainers.

French Navy Dauntlesses were based in Cognac at the end of 1944. The French Navy Dauntlesses were the last ones to see combat, during the Indochina War, flying from the carrier Arromanches (the former Royal Navy carrier Colossus). In late 1947 during one operation in the Indochina War, Flotille 4F flew 200 missions and dropped 65 tons of bombs. By 1949, the French Navy removed the Dauntless from combat status although the type was still flown as a trainer through 1953.

Royal New Zealand Air Force
The Royal New Zealand Air Force received 18 SBD-3s and 23 SBD-4s and No. 25 Squadron RNZAF used them in combat over the South Pacific. Under the original plan, four Squadrons (25, 26, 27 and 28) of the RNZAF were going to be equipped with the Dauntless but only 25 Squadron used them. The RNZAF soon replaced them with F4U Corsairs.

Variants

XBT-2 prototype, airframe was a production Northrop BT-1 heavily modified and redesignated as the XBT-2. Further modified by Douglas as the XSBD-1.
SBD-1 Marine Corps version without self-sealing fuel tanks; 57 built.
SBD-1P reconnaissance aircraft, converted from SBD-1s.
SBD-2 Navy version with increased fuel capacity and different armament but without self-sealing fuel tanks, starting in early 1941; 87 built.
SBD-2P reconnaissance aircraft, converted from SBD-2s.
SBD-3 began to be manufactured in early 1941. This provided increased protection, self-sealing fuel tanks, and four machine guns; 584 were built.
SBD-4 provided a 24-volt (up from 12 volt) electrical system; In addition, a new propeller and fuel pumps rounded out the improvements over the SBD-3. 780 built.
SBD-4P reconnaissance aircraft, converted from SBD-4s.
SBD-5 The most produced version, primarily produced at the Douglas Aircraft plant in Tulsa, Oklahoma. Equipped with a 1,200-hp engine and an increased ammunition supply. A total of 2,965 were built, and a few were shipped to the Royal Navy for evaluation. In addition to American service, these saw combat against the Japanese with No. 25 Squadron of the Royal New Zealand Air Force which soon replaced them with F4Us, and against the Luftwaffe with the Free French Air Force. A few were also sent to Mexico.
SBD-5A
as A-24B, for USAAF but delivered to USMC; 60 built.
SBD-6 The final version, providing more improvements, including a  engine, but production ended in the summer of 1944; 450 built.
A-24 Banshee (SBD-3A) USAAF equivalent of the SBD-3 without arrestor hook; 168 built.
A-24A Banshee (SBD-4A) USAAF equivalent of the SBD-4; 170 built.
A-24B Banshee (SBD-5A) USAAF equivalent of the SBD-5; 615 built.

Operators

 Chilean Air Force operated A-24B Banshees.

 French Air Force
 French Navy

 Mexican Air Force

 Moroccan Desert Police

 Royal New Zealand Air Force
 No. 25 Squadron RNZAF

 Royal Air Force received aircraft for evaluation from the nine originally tested by the Fleet Air Arm.
 Royal Navy Fleet Air Arm received nine former United States Navy SBD-5s for evaluation.

 United States Army Air Forces
 339th Bombardment Group (Dive), as operational training unit in 1942-1943
 United States Marine Corps
 United States Navy

Notable accidents

 On 7 December 1943, during a joint U.S. Navy–U.S. Marine simulated close air support exercise near Pauwela, Maui, Territory of Hawaii, the pilot of a U.S. Navy SBD-5, BuNo 36045 of squadron VB-10, initiated a slight right-hand turn and deployed dive brakes in preparation for a bomb run, but his aircraft was struck by a second VB-10 SBD-5, 36099, that did not have dive brakes deployed. Both aircraft crashed, and a bomb knocked loose from 36045 fell in the midst of a group of marines and detonated, killing 20 and seriously injuring 24. Both SBD pilots parachuted to safety, but both SBD gunners died, one after an unsuccessful bailout attempt. The collision was attributed to poor judgment and flying technique by both pilots. Aviation Archaeology Investigation & Research gives the date of this accident as 6 December.

Surviving aircraft
The hyphenated numbers are original U.S. Army Air Forces Serial Numbers (AAF Ser. No.); four or five digit numbers are original U.S. Navy Bureau of Aeronautics (BuAer) Bureau Numbers (BuNo).

New Zealand
On display
SBD-4
 06853 – Royal New Zealand Air Force Museum in Christchurch.

Solomon Islands

On display
SBD-?
 Unknown – Vilu Military Museum in Guadalcanal.

United States
Airworthy
A-24A
 42-60817 – based at the Erickson Aircraft Collection in Madras, Oregon as an SBD-3.
A-24B
 42-54682 – based at the Lone Star Flight Museum in Houston, Texas as an SBD-5.
SBD-4
 10518 – based at the Yanks Air Museum in Chino, California.
 10694 – based at the National Museum of World War II Aviation in Colorado Springs, Colorado.
SBD-5
 28536 – based at the Planes of Fame in Chino, California.
 54532 – based at the Commemorative Air Force – Airbase Georgia in Peachtree City, Georgia
On display
A-24B
 42-54582 – National Museum of the United States Air Force at Wright-Patterson Air Force Base in Dayton, Ohio.
 42-54654 – Pima Air & Space Museum, adjacent to Davis-Monthan Air Force Base, Tucson, Arizona.
SBD-2
 02106 – National Naval Aviation Museum at Naval Air Station Pensacola, Florida. Veteran of the Pearl Harbor attack and the Battle of Midway.
 02173 – Pearl Harbor Aviation Museum at Ford Island, Hawaii.
SBD-3

 06508 – National World War II Museum in New Orleans, Louisiana.
 06583 – National Museum of the Marine Corps at Marine Corps Base Quantico, Virginia.
 06624 – Air Zoo in Kalamazoo, Michigan. It is on loan from National Naval Aviation Museum at Naval Air Station Pensacola.
 06694 –  museum in Corpus Christi, Texas. It is on loan from National Naval Aviation Museum at Naval Air Station Pensacola.
SBD-4
 06833 – National Naval Aviation Museum at Naval Air Station Pensacola, Florida in its recovered condition in a simulated underwater exhibit.
 06900 – San Diego Aerospace Museum in San Diego, California. It is on loan from the National Naval Aviation Museum at Naval Air Station Pensacola.
 10575 – Battle of Midway Memorial at Midway Airport in Chicago, Illinois.
SBD-5
 36173 –  at the Patriot's Point Naval and Maritime Museum in Mount Pleasant, South Carolina.
 36176 – Palm Springs Air Museum in Palm Springs, California.
 36291 - Valiant Air Command Warbird Museum in Titusville, Florida. It is on loan from the National Naval Aviation Museum at Naval Air Station Pensacola.
 36711 - American Heritage Museum in Hudson, Massachusetts. Long term loan from the National Naval Aviation Museum at Naval Air Station Pensacola. Formerly on display at Pearl Harbor Aviation Museum at Ford Island, Hawaii.
SBD-6
 54605 – National Air and Space Museum in Washington, D.C.
 54654 – USS Midway Museum in San Diego, California.
Under restoration or in storage
SBD-1
 1612 – for display at the Air Zoo in Portage, Michigan.
SBD-4
 10508 – for display at the Castle Air Museum at the former Castle Air Force Base in Atwater, California.
SBD-5
 36175 – to flightworthiness at the Military Aviation Museum in Virginia Beach, Virginia.

Specifications (SBD-5)

See also

References

Notes

Citations

Bibliography

 Bowers, Peter M. United States Navy Aircraft since 1911. Annapolis, Maryland, USA: Naval Institute Press, 1990. .
 Brazelton, David. The Douglas SBD Dauntless, Aircraft in Profile 196. Leatherhead, Surrey, UK: Profile Publications Ltd., 1967. No ISBN.
 Brown, Eric, CBE, DCS, AFC, RN, William Green and Gordon Swanborough. "Douglas Dauntless". Wings of the Navy, Flying Allied Carrier Aircraft of World War Two. London: Jane's Publishing Company, 1980, pp. 52–60. .
 Buell, Harold L. Dauntless Helldivers: A Dive Bomber Pilot's Epic Story of the Carrier Battles. New York: Crown, 1991. .
 Dann, Richard, S. SBD Dauntless Walk Around, Walk Around Number 33. Carrollton, Texas, USA: Squadron/Signal Publications, Inc., 2004. .
 Drendel, Lou. U.S. Navy Carrier Bombers of World War II. Carrollton, Texas, USA: Squadron/Signal Publications, Inc., 1987. .
 Francillon, René J. McDonnell Douglas Aircraft since 1920. London: Putnam, 1979. .
 Gunston, Bill. The Illustrated History of McDonnell Douglas Aircraft: From Cloudster to Boeing. London: Osprey Publishing, 1999. .
 Hernandez, Daniel V. with Lt. CDR Richard H. Best, USN Ret. SBD-3 Dauntless and the Battle of Midway. Valencia, Spain: Aeronaval Publishing, 2004. .
 Howard, John Jr. A Marine Dive-Bomber Pilot at Guadalcanal. Tuscaloosa, Alabama, USA: University of Alabama Press, 1987. .
 Janowicz, Krzysztof and Andre R. Zbiegniewski. Douglas SBD Dauntless (Bilingual Polish/English). Lublin, Poland: Kagero, 2007.
 Jenks, Cliff F.L. with Malcolm Laird and Phil Listemann. Allied Wings No.5: The Dauntless in RNZAF Service. France: www.raf-in-combat.com, 2008. .
 Kinzey, Bert. SBD Dauntless in Detail & Scale, D&S Vol.48. Carrollton, Texas, USA: Squadron/Signal Publications, Inc., 1996. .
 Mondey, David, The Concise Guide to American Aircraft of World War II. London: Chancellor, 1996. .
 
 Pęczkowski, Robert. Douglas SBD Dauntless. Sandomierz, Poland/Redbourn, UK: Mushroom Model Publications, 2007. .
 Potter, E. B. Admiral Arliegh Burke. Annapolis, Maryland: U.S. Naval Institute Press, 2005. .
 Smith, Peter C. Douglas SBD Dauntless. Ramsbury, Marlborough, Wiltshire, UK: The Crowood Press Ltd., 1997. .
 Smith, Peter C. The History of Dive-Bombing. Barnsley, UK: Pen & Sword Aviation, 2007. .
 Stern, Robert. SBD Dauntless in Action, Aircraft Number 64. Carrollton, Texas, USA: Squadron/Signal Publications, Inc., 1984. .
 Tillman, Barrett. The Dauntless Dive Bomber of World War II. Annapolis, Maryland, USA: Naval Institute Press, 1976 (softcover 2006). .
 Tillman, Barrett. SBD Dauntless Units of World War 2. Botley, Oxford, UK: Osprey Publishing, 1998. .
 Tillman, Barrett and Robert L. Lawson. U.S. Navy Dive and Torpedo Bombers of World War II. St. Paul, Minnesota, USA: Motor Books Publishing, 2001. .
 White, Alexander S. Dauntless Marine: Joseph Sailer Jr., Dive-Bombing Ace of Guadalcanal. Santa Rosa, California, USA: Pacifica Press, 1997. .
 Wildenberg, Thomas. Destined for Glory: Dive Bombing, Midway, and the Evolution of Carrier Airpower. Annapolis, Maryland: U.S. Naval Institute Press, 1998. .
 Wheeler, Barry C. The Hamlyn Guide to Military Aircraft Markings. London: Chancellor Press, 1992. .
 Yenne, Bill. McDonnell Douglas: A Tale of Two Giants. New York: Crescent Books, 1985. .

External links

 Warbird Alley: SBD
 The SBD Shipborne Dive Bomber
 Aero-Web.org: SBD-5 Dauntless
 Boeing history of SBD Dauntless Divebomber
 Douglas SBD Dauntless onboard the USS Yorktown (CV-10) at Patriot's Point Naval & Maritime Museum near Charleston, SC
  "Diving Artillery" , April 1942, Popular Science article on the first U.S. Army A-24 unit, with rare photos of the A-24
 SBD-2 Dauntless BuNo 2106 Cockpit Panorama, National Naval Aviation Museum, NAS Pensacola, FL

SB1D Dauntless
1930s United States attack aircraft
1940s United States bomber aircraft
Single-engined tractor aircraft
Low-wing aircraft
Carrier-based aircraft
World War II dive bombers of the United States
Douglas
Aircraft first flown in 1940